Clostridium pasteurianum (previously known as Clostridium pastorianum) is a bacterium discovered in 1890 by the Russian microbiologist Sergei Winogradsky. It was the first free living (non-symbiotic) micro-organism discovered that could fix free nitrogen from the air.

Clostridium pasteurianum is a producer of carboxylic acids. It has the ability to convert carbohydrates to butyrate, acetate, carbon dioxide, and molecular hydrogen through fermentation. Similar to Clostridium acetobutylicum, Clostridium pasteurianum also has the ability to switch from acid to solvent production under certain growth conditions, Several efforts have been made to document its growth conditions; however, it is still unclear whether the growth parameters which have been shown to produce favorable solvent production in C. acetobutylicum played a significant role in the regulation of metabolism in C. pasteurianum in a similar fashion. It produces the gaseous alteration of canned fruits and tomatoes and does not develop at a pH lower than 3.7.

C. pasteurianum is a mesophile.

Taxonomy 

Initially named Clostridium pastorianum by Winogradsky, its name was later changed to the current spelling.

Morphology 

Clostridium pasteurianum is a large, Gram-positive, spore-forming bacillus. It is a soil bacterium, and an obligate anaerobe.

References

External links 
 Type strain of Clostridium pasteurianum at BacDive -  the Bacterial Diversity Metadatabase

Gram-positive bacteria
Bacteria described in 1895
pasteurianum